Lukáš Vaculík (born 6 June 1983) is a former Czech football player who last played for Vysočina Jihlava. He has represented his country at youth international level.

References

External links
 
 
 Profile at Vysočina Jihlava website

1983 births
Living people
Czech footballers
Czech First League players
FC Vysočina Jihlava players
FK Mladá Boleslav players
1. FK Příbram players
FC Viktoria Plzeň players
FK Viktoria Žižkov players
Slovak Super Liga players
FC Spartak Trnava players
Association football midfielders
Footballers from Brno
Czech National Football League players
SK Hanácká Slavia Kroměříž players
Czech Republic youth international footballers